Purple World is the second studio album by American rapper Big Moe, from Houston, Texas. It was released on April 23, 2002, via Wreckshop Records, Priority Records and Capitol Records.

Track listing

Charts

References

External links

2002 albums
Big Moe albums